In geometry, the mean width is a measure of the "size" of a body; see Hadwiger's theorem for more about the available measures of bodies.
The "width" of a body in a given direction  is the distance between the closest pair of such planes, such that the body is entirely in between the two hyper planes (the planes only intersect 
with the boundary of the body).

More formally, define a compact body B as being equivalent to set of points in its interior plus the points on the boundary (here, points denote elements of ). The support function of body B is defined as

 

The mean width is then

 

Note, that the mean width can be defined for any body (that is compact), but it is most
useful for convex bodies (that is bodies, whose corresponding set is a convex set).

Mean widths of convex bodies in low dimensions

One dimension
The mean width of a line segment L is the length (1-volume) of L.

Two dimensions
The mean width w of any compact shape S in two dimensions is p/π, where p is the perimeter of the convex hull of S. So w is the diameter of a circle with the same perimeter as the convex hull.

Three dimensions
For convex bodies K in three dimensions, the mean width of K is related to the average of the mean curvature, H, over the whole surface of K. In fact,

 

where  is the boundary of the convex body  and 
a surface integral element,  is the mean curvature at the corresponding position
Similar relations can be given between the other measures  
and the generalizations of the mean curvature, also for other dimensions 
.
As the integral over the mean curvature is typically much easier to calculate
than the mean width, this is a very useful result.

See also

Curve of constant width

References

Further reading

The mean width is usually mentioned in any good reference on convex geometry, for instance, Selected topics in convex geometry by Maria Moszyńska (Birkhäuser, Boston 2006).  The relation between the mean width and the mean curvature is also derived in that reference.

The application of the mean width as one of the measures featuring in Hadwiger's theorem
is discussed in Beifang Chen in "A simplified elementary proof of Hadwiger's volume theorem." Geom. Dedicata 105 (2004), 107—120.

Integral geometry